Newmarket-on-Fergus GAA is a Gaelic Athletic Association club in the village of Newmarket-on-Fergus, in County Clare, Ireland. The club has the distinction of winning the first ever Clare Senior Football Championship and has won the Clare Senior Hurling Championship more times than any other club. In 2012 they won their first Senior Hurling title in 31 years, defeating Cratloe in the final.
They have under 6+ hurling, under 8+ camogie, under 10+ ladies football and under 8-12 football teams.

Major honours

Hurling
 Munster Senior Club Hurling Championship (2): 1967, 1968
 Clare Senior Hurling Championship (23): 1912, 1916, 1925, 1926, 1927, 1930, 1931, 1936, 1955, 1963, 1964, 1965, 1967, 1968, 1969, 1971, 1972, 1973, 1974, 1976, 1978, 1981, 2012
 Clare Intermediate Hurling Championship (1): 1967
 Munster Junior Club Hurling Championship (1): 2003
 Clare Junior A Hurling Championship (5): 1926, 1972, 1998, 2003, 2011
 Clare Under-21 A Hurling Championship (7): 1967, 1968, 1970, 2001, 2004, 2005, 2006
 Clare Minor A Hurling Championship (6): 1961, 1968, 1998, 2002, 2007, 2010

Gaelic Football
 Clare Senior Football Championship (2): 1887, 1888

Notable players
 Jim Cullinan
 John Joe Doyle
 John Fox
 John McMahon
 Colin Ryan

References

External links
Official Newmarket-on-Fergus GAA Club website

Hurling clubs in County Clare
Gaelic football clubs in County Clare
Gaelic games clubs in County Clare